The Russell's toadlet (Uperoleia russelli) is a species of frog in the family Myobatrachidae.
It is endemic to Australia.
Its natural habitats are subtropical or tropical dry lowland grassland, intermittent rivers, freshwater marshes, intermittent freshwater marshes, and canals and ditches.

References

Uperoleia
Amphibians of Western Australia
Taxonomy articles created by Polbot
Amphibians described in 1933
Frogs of Australia